The Liverpool-class motorised lifeboat was a non-self-righting boat operated by the Royal National Lifeboat Institution (RNLI) from its stations around the coast of the United Kingdom and Ireland. The boats were designed for carriage launching and were developed from the Liverpool-Class Pulling and Sailing type  of lifeboats - there were two types built, single and twin engined.

History
The Liverpool class, designed by James Barnett, was derived from the 35ft 6in Self-righting motor-class lifeboat and had many similarities with it. Lifeboatmen at many stations preferred non self-righting boats due to their better stability and the Liverpool class was designed to be light enough for carriage launching at these stations. The single-engined version entered service in 1932 and was powered by an RNLI designed, Weyburn Engineering built AE6 six-cylinder  petrol engine mounted in a watertight compartment. Like all early motor lifeboats, the Liverpool class carried an auxiliary sailing rig and had a drop keel just forward of the engine room. 28 boats were built between 1931 and 1941. The introduction of tractors to assist with carriage launching enabled the RNLI to consider a heavier, twin-engined version of the Liverpool class and a prototype was ordered but was destroyed in an air raid at the builder's yard at Cowes in May 1942. Production got underway early in 1945 and the boat was powered by two  Weyburn AE4 four-cylinder petrol engines mounted in a watertight compartment. The extra redundancy of twin engines reduced the need for auxiliary sails. 31 boats were built between 1945 and 1954, the last 21 of which were powered by  Ferry Kadenacy FKR3 diesels.
The William Cantrell Ashley now July 2017 is in dry standing Penarth marina, Cardiff.

Description
The Liverpool class was based on the  Self-righting motor introduced in 1929, but had greater beam ( rather than ) and much shallower endboxes. The shelter was extended forward to cover the engine compartment, which was watertight and allowed the engine to continue to operate as long as the air intake was not submerged. The single propeller was protected by the keel. The twin-engined variant was visually very similar but had  more beam and the twin propellers were in protective tunnels. In the mid 1960s the petrol engines in the first ten boats were replaced by  Parsons Penguin diesels (as were a couple of the Ferry engined boats). Only one single-engined boat, ON 832, was re-engined with a diesel engine, a Parsons Porbeagle of 47 hp.

Fleet

Single screw boats

Twin screw boats
All boats were built by Groves & Guttridge, Cowes except for ON 877 (J. Samuel White, Cowes) and ON 882 (Rowhedge Ironworks, Rowhedge).

References

External links
 RNLI